Banks House may refer to:

Coleman-Banks House, Eutaw, Alabama, listed on the NRHP in Alabama
Banks House (Hiwasse, Arkansas), listed on the NRHP in Arkansas
Ralph Banks Place, Elberton, Georgia, listed on the NRHP in Georgia
Gordon-Banks House, Newnan, Georgia, listed on the NRHP in Georgia
Gale-Banks House, Waltham, Massachusetts, listed on the NRHP in Massachusetts
E. Sybbill Banks House, Waltham, Massachusetts, listed on the NRHP in Massachusetts
Harris-Banks House, Columbus, Mississippi, listed on the NRHP in Mississippi
Jones-Banks-Leigh House, Columbus, Mississippi, listed on the NRHP in Mississippi
Root-Banks House, Medford, Oregon, listed on the NRHP in Oregon
Col. J. A. Banks House, St. Matthews, South Carolina, listed on the NRHP in South Carolina
Banks-Mack House, Fort Mill, South Carolina, listed on the NRHP in South Carolina
Banks-Ogg House, Lufkin, Texas, listed on the NRHP in Texas

See also
Bank House, Milford, Delaware, NRHP-listed